The Central District of Mobarakeh County is a district (bakhsh) in Mobarakeh County, Isfahan Province, Iran. At the 2006 census, its population was 105,134, in 27,951 families.  The District has four cities: Mobarakeh, Dizicheh, Talkhuncheh, and Karkevand. The District has three rural districts (dehestan): Dizicheh Rural District, Karkevand Rural District, and Talkhuncheh Rural District.

References 

Mobarakeh County
Districts of Isfahan Province